Rachel Holly Priest (born 13 June 1985 in New Plymouth, Taranaki) is a New Zealand cricketer who plays as a wicket-keeper and right-handed batter. She played for New Zealand between 2007 and 2020.

Career

Domestic and franchise 
In May 2018, she was signed by the Wales women's national cricket team, their first overseas signing. In November 2018, she was named in Sydney Thunder's squad for the 2018–19 Women's Big Bash League season. In January 2020, she was named in New Zealand's squad for the 2020 ICC Women's T20 World Cup in Australia. She also played for the Wellington Blaze in the State League.

In June 2020, Priest joined the Tasmanian Tigers in Australia's Women's National Cricket League. 

She was drafted by Trent Rockets for the inaugural season of The Hundred.

International 
She made her ODI debut in 2007 against Australia. Priest played in 87 ODIs and 75 T20Is for New Zealand before retiring from international cricket in 2020. Priest holds the record for the highest individual score by a better in a Women's ODI innings as wicketkeeper (157) and is the only wicketkeeper in Women's ODI history to score 150 in an innings. In June 2020, Priest announced her retirement from international cricket.

One Day International centuries

See also 
 List of centuries in women's One Day International cricket

References

External links 
 
 
 

1985 births
Berkshire women cricketers
Central Districts Hinds cricketers
Cricketers from New Plymouth
Hobart Hurricanes (WBBL) cricketers
Living people
Melbourne Renegades (WBBL) cricketers
New Zealand women cricketers
New Zealand women One Day International cricketers
New Zealand women Twenty20 International cricketers
Staffordshire women cricketers
Sydney Thunder (WBBL) cricketers
Tasmanian Tigers (women's cricket) cricketers
Wales women cricketers
Wellington Blaze cricketers
Western Storm cricketers
Trent Rockets cricketers
Wicket-keepers
New Zealand expatriate sportspeople in England
New Zealand expatriate sportspeople in Australia